The Love Letters of Baroness S (German: Liebesbriefe der Baronin von S...) is a 1924 German silent film directed by Henrik Galeen and starring Mia May and Memo Benassi.

The film's sets were designed by the art director Paul Leni. Location shooting took place around Rimini.

Cast
 Mia May as Baronin von S.  
 Alfredo Bertone as Baron von S.  
 Memo Benassi as Straßenmusikant Giovanni  
 Desdemona Mazza as Kokotte Jou-Jou - Ginetta  
 Ernst Gronau as Marquis Grillon

References

Bibliography
 Grange, William. Cultural Chronicle of the Weimar Republic. Scarecrow Press, 2008.

External links

1924 films
Films of the Weimar Republic
Films directed by Henrik Galeen
German silent feature films
UFA GmbH films
German black-and-white films